Tomohiro  is a masculine Japanese given name.

Possible writings
Tomohiro can be written using many different combinations of kanji characters. Some examples:

友弘, "friend, vast"
友広, "friend, wide"
友寛, "friend, generosity"
友博, "friend, doctor"
友大, "friend, big"
友裕, "friend, abundant"
友洋, "friend, ocean"
知弘, "know, vast"
知広, "know, wide"
知寛, "know, generosity"
知博, "know, doctor"
知大, "know, big"
知裕, "know, abundant"
智弘, "intellect, vast"
智広, "intellect, wide"
智寛, "intellect, generosity"
智博, "intellect, doctor"
共弘, "together, vast"
共寛, "together, generosity"
朋弘, "companion, vast"
朋寛, "companion, generosity"
朝弘, "morning/dynasty, vast"
朝広, "morning/dynasty, wide"
朝大, "morning/dynasty, big"
朝洋, "morning/dynasty, ocean"

The name can also be written in hiragana ともひろ or katakana トモヒロ.

Notable people with the name
, Japanese baseball player
, Japanese professional baseball pitcher
, Japanese sport wrestler
, Japanese professional wrestler
, Japanese sprinter
, Japanese mass murderer
, Japanese sport shooter
,Japanese professional golfer
, Japanese freestyle wrestler
, retired Japanese male butterfly swimmer
, Japanese shogi player
, Japanese former professional baseball player
, Japanese video game developer
, Japanese voice actor, actor, and singer-songwriter
, Japanese racewalker
, Japanese high jumper
, Japanese volleyball player
, Japanese Director of Creative Cluster
, Japanese conductor
, Japanese voice actor
, Japanese football player
, Japanese politician
, Japanese volleyball player
, Japanese freestyle swimmer

See also
 6570 Tomohiro

Japanese masculine given names